Route 16 is a , two-lane, uncontrolled-access, secondary highway in eastern Prince Edward Island. Its eastern terminus is at Route 2 and Macphee Avenue in Souris and its western terminus is at Route 313 in Saint Peters Bay. The route is entirely in Kings County.

Route description 

The route begins at its eastern terminus and heads northeast before curving westward in East Point. It continues west until Cable Head, where it curves south before ending at its western terminus.

Major intersections

Route 16A 

Its southern terminus is at Route 16 in South Lake and its northern terminus is at Route 16 in North Lake. It is a suffixed highway of Route 16 and is located completely in Kings County.

References 

016
016